Derek James (born 28 September 1960) is a South African professional golfer currently playing on the Sunshine Tour.

James was born in Durban and lives in Southbroom with his wife and two children. He was the 1984 South African Strokeplay champion, his biggest amateur win. He turned professional later that year and joined the Sunshine Tour. He won his first title there in 1991, and would add six more wins between then and 1994. He was also runner-up in the South African Open in 1992, and won the Canadian Tournament Players' Championship in 1994, in addition to picking up three minor tournament victories in the United States. He retired from competitive golf in 1997, and is now the head professional at Southbroom Golf Club.

Amateur highlights
1982–84 SA National Team
1984 SA Strokeplay Champion

Professional wins (11)

Sunshine Tour wins (7)
1991 (1) River Sun Challenge
1992 (3) Iscor Newcastle Classic, Kalahari Classic, Mercedez Benz Golf Challenge
1993 (2) Lombard Tryes Classic, Momentum Life Classic
1994 (1) Sanlam Cancer Challenge

Other wins (4)
1994 Canadian Tournament Players' Championship
3 minor tournaments in the United States

Team appearances
Amateur
Eisenhower Trophy (representing South Africa): 1982

References

External links

South African male golfers
Sunshine Tour golfers
Sportspeople from Durban
1960 births
Living people